Kazimierz Seichter (22 February 1900 – 13 December 1971) was a Polish footballer. He played in three matches for the Poland national football team from 1925 to 1927.

References

External links
 

1900 births
1971 deaths
Polish footballers
Poland international footballers
Place of birth missing
Association footballers not categorized by position